General Yun Ung-nyeol or Yun Woong Niel, also known as Yun Ung-ryeol (윤웅렬, 1840-1911), was a Joseon Dynasty and Korean Empire soldier and Gaehwa Party politician.

Yun Ung-nyeol was a pro-Japanese scholar-bureaucrat of the Joseon Dynasty and Korean Empire in the late 19th and early 20th centuries. A penname of his was Bangye (반계/磻溪).

Biography

Yun Ung-nyeol was a member of one of the prominent yangban families of Korea. His family was considered wealthy, which his father had paved the way to prominence by himself. From his early age, Yun and his younger brother were famous for their great physical abilities.

At the age of 17, Yun went to Seoul by himself and took the Gwageo Military Examination, and passed the exam, making him an official.

He was a long-time Gaehwa Party member with Kim Ok-gyun and Hong Yeongsik.

In 1904, Yun Ung-nyeol was the Korea's Minister of War. On 30 September 1904, Yun was appointed as the Chief of Staff of Korean Empire but he resigned on 30 January 1905 making him the last incumbent. He died in 1911, aged 71.

In modern Korean historiography, General Yun has been designated one of the Chinilpa or pro-Japanese activists of the 1900s (decade).

See also 
 Gapshun Coup
 Yun Chi-ho
 Yun Bo-seon
 Kim Ok-gyun
 Hong Yeong-sik
 Philip Jaisohn

Notes

References
 Kranewitter, Rudolf. (2005). Dynamik der Religion Schamanismus, Konfuzianismus, Buddhismus und Christentum in der Geschichte Koreas von der steinzeitlichen Besiedlung des Landes bis zum Ende des 20. Jahrhunderts. Münster: LIT Verlag. ; 
 Leibo, Steven A. (2006). East and Southeast Asia. Harpers Ferry, West Virginia: Stryker-Post Publications. 
 Speer, Robert E. (1905). "Korea, Japan and Russia," in  The Ideal Home Educator: a Superb Library of Useful Knowledge. Chicago: Bible House. 
 Wells, Kenneth M. (1991). New God, New nation: Protestants and Self-Reconstruction Nationalism in Korea, 1896-1937. Honolulu: University of Hawaii Press. ; 

1840 births
1911 deaths
Korean politicians
Korean collaborators with Imperial Japan
Yun Chi-ho
19th-century Korean people
Kazoku
Lieutenant generals of Korean Empire
Imperial Korean military personnel
Politicians of the Korean Empire
Joseon Kazoku